Bryce Hallett is a Canadian independent animator living and working in Toronto, Ontario, Canada. A graduate of Sheridan College's classical animation program and Canadore College's graphic communications program, Hallett has been creating numerous cartoons and animations since 1999 working under his business "Frog Feet Productions". His first job was creating the "Ranger Gord's Educational Films" and "Ranger Gord's Safety Tips" cartoons based on the character of the same name for The Red Green Show created by Steve Smith which aired on CBC Television and PBS.

Since that time, Hallett has created numerous other animated shorts for sketch comedy TV series; a list that includes animation for Gemini Nominated History Bites (created by Rick Green), Listen Missy (created by Jane Ford) and The Frantics. He has also contributed animation to numerous music videos and TV commercials airing across Canada and the United States and in films ranging from small Canadian independent films like "At Home by Myself...With You" (dir Kris Booth, 2009) and documentaries. Trained in traditional animation and graphic design, Hallett has been known to experiment with a variety of styles and techniques including photography, cutout animation, stopmotion, watercolour and other media and various computer software.

He is the illustrator of the book "Animation Unleashed: 100 Principles Every Animator, Comic Book Writer, Filmmaker, Video Artist, and Game Developer Should Know" written by veteran animator and "award-winning director of films for the National Film Board of Canada" Ellen Besen. Released in 2008.

Selected works

Television
The Red Green Show (Animator/ director of Ranger Gord's Educational Films, 23 episodes) (1999–2004)
History Bites (animator/ designer 11 episodes) (2003)
Listen Missy! (animator) (2004)
The Frantics (comedy) Reunion Special (animator) (2005)
History Bites: Mother Britain (animator) (1 hour special) (2005)
History Bites: Uncle Sam (animator) (1 hour special) (2006)
History Bites: The Separatists (animator) (1 hour special) (2007)
History Bites: Celine Dion (animator and also appears as himself) (1 hour special) (2008)
What a Booty (Animator) (1 hour doc directed by Tantyana Terzoupoulos) (2008)

Music videos
Howie Beck (Alice) (contributing animator) (2004) (dir by Tin Can Forest aka Marek Colek and Samantha Ferguson)
Robin Black (Why Don't You Love me?) (animator/designer/storyboards) (2005) Directed by Kris Lefcoe & Ghost Milk Studios. Animation by Ghostmilk, Bryce Hallett, Justin Lee and Chris Stone.
Eminem (Shake That feat. Nate Dogg (contributing animator) (2006) ( dir by Plates Animation)
Delica-m (Counting Stars) (Animator/Designer) (2010)

Feature films
At Home by Myself...With You (dir Kris Booth ) (Animation by Bryce Hallett) (2009)
Tall Girls: A Story of Giants (dir Edda Baumann von Broen ) (Animation by Bryce Hallett) (2011)

Bibliography
List of books illustrated by Bryce Hallett

Notes

External links
Frog Feet Productions
Toronto Animated Image Society

Animations on YouTube

Living people
Canadore College alumni
Artists from Ontario
Canadian animated film directors
1976 births
Canadian bloggers
Stop motion animators
Sheridan College animation program alumni
People from North Bay, Ontario